WBK or wbk may refer to:

 Wielkopolski Bank Kredytowy, a defunct commercial bank based in Poland
 WBK, the station code for Warabrook railway station, New South Wales, Australia
 wbk, the ISO 639-3 code for Kalasha-ala, Afghanistan